ortho-Nitrophenyl-β-galactoside (ONPG) is a colorimetric and spectrophotometric substrate for detection of β-galactosidase activity. This compound is normally colorless. However, if β-galactosidase is present, it hydrolyzes the ONPG molecule into galactose and ortho-nitrophenol. The latter compound has a yellow color that can be used to check for enzyme activity by means of a colorimetric assay (at 420 nm wavelength).  β-Galactosidase is required for lactose utilization, so the intensity of the color produced can be used as a measure of the enzymatic rate.

Though ONPG mimics lactose and is hydrolyzed by β-galactosidase, it is unable to act as an inducer for the lac operon. Without another lactose analog that can act as an inducer, such as isopropyl β-D-1-thiogalactopyranoside (IPTG), β-galactosidase will not be transcribed and ONPG will not be hydrolyzed.

References

Galactosides
Nitrobenzenes